Varley is a surname. The surname is either an English surname of Norman origin or an Irish surname of native Irish (Gaelic) origin. In Irish the surname is Mac an Bhearshúiligh (for a man) and Nic an Bhearshúiligh (for a woman) (but also sometimes in Irish it is written as Uí Bhearshúiligh (O'Varley) or Mac / Ní / Uí a Bhearsula or Mac / Ní / Uí an Bhearlaigh.

Origins 

As a northern English surname, it originates in Normandy and Picardy in France as an habitational name from Verly in Aisne, Picardy, France (or from Vesly (La Manche) or Vesly (Eure), or Vrély (Somme), all in Normandy or Picardy (modern day Hauts-de-France) in France), so named from the Gallo-Roman personal name Virilius + the locative suffix -acum.  Following the Norman conquest of England in 1066, over the centuries the original Norman French de Verli or de Verley, came to be written as Varley. It is said that the Magni Rotuli Scaccarii Normanniae records that Robert de Verlie, Normandy 1180-95 and Robert de Verli held land in Norfolk in 1086. Hugh and William de Verli held lands in Essex and York and later, Torald de Verli gave lands to Salop Abbey, c. 1100. This originally Norman version of the name is overwhelmingly found in West Yorkshire and Lancashire in northern England.

As an Irish surname, it is a Connacht name, found particularly in the counties of Mayo and Galway, with a concentration in the 1901 and 1911 censuses of Ireland around the Mayo-Galway border at Cong, The Neale, An Fháirthí (or Clonbur in the Connemara Gaeltacht), and at Belclare (near Tuam) Foxhall (near Loughrea), Ballinrobe, Kilmaine, Houndswood, Burriscarra, Kilcommon etc. The Irish surname Varley is from the Irish Mac / Ní / Uí an Bhearshúiligh, Mac Giolla Bhearshúiligh, Mac a Bhearsula, or Mac an Bhearlaigh (literally "son / daugher / descendent of the sharp eyed man"). The name was Anglicised variously as Varely, Varily, Varley, Varrilly, Varrelly, Varly, Farley etc. In County Armagh, Mac Giolla Bhearshúiligh was Anglicised as Vallelly and MacIlvallelly. The censuses for England and Wales from 1841 to 1921 show many Varley families were born in Ireland among the majority who were born in England. E.g. in the 1911 census for England and Wales there is a Varley family of 10 all born in County Mayo, Ireland and recorded living in Morley, Leeds, West Yorkshire, England. Almost all people recorded with the surname Varley in the 1901 and 1911 censuses of Ireland were recorded as being able to speak Irish (and more often than not also English).

Notable people with the surname Varley 
 Adrian Varley (Irish: Adrian Mac an Bhearlaigh) Irish Gaelic footballer for New York GAA, and formerly for Galway GAA and Cortoon Shamrocks GAA in County Galway
 Dr. Anthony (Tony) Varley, Irish academic, Political Science & Sociology, National University of Ireland, Galway (NUI Galway), Ireland.
 Aoife and Niamh Varley (sometimes McDonnell) (born 1997), Irish Siamese twins born (in Manchester, England) to Joan Varley of Castlebar, Co Mayo, Ireland.
 Beatrice Varley (1896–1964), British actress
 C. F. Varley (1828–1883), British electrical engineer
 Cornelius Varley (1781–1873), English artist
 Damien Varley (b. 1983), former Irish rugby union player who represented Munster and Ireland.
 Darren Varley (1973–1999), Canadian manslaughter victim
 Declan Varley (born 1965, Ballinrobe, County Mayo, Ireland) Irish journalist and author, Editor of the Galway Advertiser in County Galway, Ireland.
 Enda Varley (Irish: Éanna Mac an Bhearlaigh), Irish Gaelic footballer for Mayo GAA, St Vincent's GAA in Dublin and Garrymore GAA in County Mayo.
 Eric Varley (1932–2008), English politician
 Fleetwood Varley (1862–1936), British sport shooter
 Frank Bradley Varley (1885–1929), English politician
 Frederick Horsman Varley (1881–1969), Canadian artist
 Gez Varley, British Techno musician and DJ
 H. Paul Varley (1931-2015), American academic
 Harry Varley (1867–1915), English rugby union footballer
 Isobel Varley (1937-2015), British Guinness Book of World Records recognised tattooed senior
 Dr Jarlath Varley, Irish academic and medical practitioner, a Director at the Royal College of Surgeons in Ireland's School of Nursing & Midwifery in Dublin, Ireland.
 Jarlath Varley, former Irish Gaelic footballer and senior team captain (in 2012 and 2013) for Garrymore GAA in Killeenrevagh, County Mayo, Ireland and current club officer with Garrymore GAA.
 John Varley (disambiguation), several people of that name
 Julia Varley (b. 1871), Bradford, West Yorkshire, England, English trade unionist and suffragette.
 Kate Varley, Irish journalist with RTE in Ireland. Formerly of ITV and BBC in the United Kingdom. 
 Liam Varley (Irish: Liam Mac an Bhearlaigh), Irish Hurler for Westmeath GAA
 Luke Varley (Irish: Lúcás Mac an Bhearshúiligh), Member of the South Mayo Brigade of the Irish Republican Army (I.R.A) during the Irish War of Independence.
 Lynn Varley, American comic colourist
 Martin Varley, Secretary General of the Irish Hospital Consultants Association (IHCA)
 Natalya Varley (b. 1947), Russian film and theatre actress
 Patrick Varley (Irish: Padraig Mac an Bhearshúiligh), Member of the South Mayo Brigade of the Irish Republican Army (I.R.A) during the Irish War of Independence. He took part in the Battle (or Ambush) of Toormakeady on 3 May 1921, during the Irish War of Independence, where the Irish Republican Army south Mayo flying column of around 30 men together with a small number of men from east Mayo mounted an ambush of R.I.C and Black and Tans forces at Toormakeady.
 Paul Varley (Irish: Pól Mac an Bhearlaigh) Irish Gaelic footballer for Galway GAA and Cortoon Shamrocks GAA in County Galway
 Paul Varley (1949-2008), English musician
 Susan Varley (b. 1961), British children's book illustrator
 William Varley (1880–1968), American Olympic rower
 Will Varley (b. 1987), English musician

Places 

 Ballyvarley (Irish: Baile Uí Mhearlaigh), a townland in Aghaderg civil parish, County Down, Ireland. 
 Varley, Western Australia
 Varley's Bridge (Irish: Droichead Uí Bhearshúiligh), Pollacorragune, Tuam, County Galway, Ireland. Limestone railway bridge, built c.1894, over Athenry, Co Galway to Claremorris, Co Mayo railway line.
 Varley's Island (Irish: Oileán an Bhearshúiligh), Cloonbrone, Cong, County Galway, Ireland.
 Varley's field, Ribble Valley, Lancashire, England.
 Varley Road, Slaithwaite, West Yorkshire, England.
 Varley Street, Colne, Borough of Pendle, Lancashire, England.
 Varley Street, Miles Platting, Manchester, England.
 Varley Street, Stanningley, Pudsey, West Yorkshire, England.

Other 

 Aghaderg Gaelic Athletics Club & Ballyvarley Hurling Club, County Down, Ireland.
 T.F. Varley public house, Headford, County Galway, Ireland.
 Varley Transport Limited, Haulage Contractors, An Fhairche / Clonbur, County Galway, Ireland.

References